The India national cricket team toured England from 19 July to 8 September 2007. The tour included 3 Tests and 7 ODIs. During the Test series, the Pataudi Trophy, a prize commissioned by the MCC to commemorate the 118th anniversary of India's Test debut, was competed for. This was designed and created by Jocelyn Burton, Holborn, London.

Squad

Test squads
Steve Harmison was named in the England squad for the first Test but withdrew just a day later due to a hernia and underwent an operation to treat it, ruling him out for the entire series. Chris Tremlett was named as his replacement. Matthew Hoggard did not play in the first two Test matches against India after being sent to hospital following a back spasm.

With the resignation of Greg Chappell after the Cricket World Cup 2007 and Graham Ford declining the position of Indian coach, India entered the series without a coach. Virender Sehwag and Harbhajan Singh were not named in the Indian squad due to recent poor performances while Irfan Pathan and Munaf Patel were not fully fit.

ODI squads
On 7 August 2007, the BCCI Secretary Niranjan Shah named the Indian squad for the seven-match ODI series.

The list of players are: Rahul Dravid (captain), Mahendra Singh Dhoni, Sachin Tendulkar, Sourav Ganguly, Yuvraj Singh, Ramesh Powar, Dinesh Karthik, Zaheer Khan, R. P. Singh, Munaf Patel, Robin Uthappa, Rohit Sharma, Piyush Chawla, Gautam Gambhir, Ajit Agarkar.

Tour matches

First-class: Sussex v Indians

First-class: England Lions v Indians

First-class: Indians v Sri Lanka A

List A: England Lions v Indians

Pataudi Trophy (Test)

1st Test

Day One

The first Test match at Lord's saw Chris Tremlett make his England Test debut. Michael Vaughan won the toss and chose to bat first. Andrew Strauss and Alastair Cook took advantage of average Indian bowling scoring 40 runs after only 5 overs putting on 76 before Sourav Ganguly made the break through dismissing Cook on 36 lbw from his fourth ball of the match. No further wickets fell in the morning session although Strauss was dropped on 43 by Dinesh Karthik at the stroke of lunch.

Michael Vaughan and Strauss scored a 142 run second wicket partnership that would prove to be crucial in the match. Strauss was dismissed on 96 edging a slider from Anil Kumble. England in a seemingly strong position of 252/2 lost two quick wickets of Michael Vaughan and Paul Collingwood. Vaughan edged an R. P. Singh delivery straight to Dhoni while Paul Collingwood went for his first Test duck being deceived by a googly from Kumble and was trapped lbw reducing England to 255/4. This wicket meant Anil Kumble overtook Shane Warne's Test record of 138 lbw wickets. Ryan Sidebottom joined Kevin Pietersen as nightwatchman and survived 5 deliveries before the day ended with England on 268/4.

Day Two
Heavy rain in the morning and poor weather forecasts made any play on the second day a remote possibility but rain stopped at around 13:00 BST allowing play to resume at 13:50 BST. The restart saw the Indian attack dismiss England for 298 with the final 26 runs costing 6 wickets. Chris Tremlett and Monty Panesar both went for ducks while Sidebottom and Matt Prior went on 1.

There was controversial moment in this session when Pietersen began walking when he edged a ball to Dhoni and appeared to be out caught. He turned back however when he saw his team mates at the pavilion waving him to go back when they saw Steve Bucknor telling Simon Taufel he thought the ball had not carried. TV replays showed the ball did not carry and Pietersen was given not out by the third umpire Ian Gould. This decision did not cost India however as Pietersen did not score any runs before being caught.

Dinesh Karthik was dismissed early on lbw and India could have been 16/2 had Prior not drop Wasim Jaffer in the second over. Rahul Dravid could not make a start and was removed cutting an outswinger to Prior. Sachin Tendulkar consolidated India's innings however scoring 80 runs with Jaffer before he was dismissed on 37. India lost one further wicket of Jaffer (which was Tremlett first Test wicket) and closed the day on 145/4.

Day Three
The day began in similar vein to the previous one with India losing their remaining 6 wickets in the space of 15 overs closing their innings on 201. James Anderson got his career best bowling figures of 5/42 in this innings. Andrew Strauss and Alastair Cook negotiated the final two overs of the session before lunch was taken.

Play did not resume until 15:25 BST due to rain. At the restart Zaheer Khan left-handed swing troubled the opening batsmen with Strauss and Cook going out in quick succession before play stopped. After the rain interruption Vaughan and Pietersen survived the final 35 minutes of the play to end the day on 77/2 leading the game by 174 runs.

Day Four
England scored 25 runs before Vaughan was clean bowled by R. P. Singh. Collingwood and Bell's wickets soon followed and England were 132/5. No further wickets fell in the morning session and England went into lunch at 161/5. The afternoon session started with Prior and Pietersen putting on 90 runs at a rate of 5 an over to swing the game in England's favour before Prior was eventually caught by Dhoni. Chris Tremlett completed his pair being bowled by Khan, becoming the first Englishman since 1999 to get a pair on debut. Pietersen struggled to protect the tail and England were dismissed for 282 before tea setting India a target of 380 runs for victory. Singh got his bowling figures of 5/59 in this innings.

In the final session of the day, India scored runs quickly, making 137 runs at a cost of 3 wickets. India lost the key wickets of Dravid and Tendulkar both out lbw. Going into a tense final day, all results were still possible.

Day Five
India lost two early wickets of Sourav Ganguly (lbw) and Karthik (caught) meaning that any chance of an Indian victory disappeared. Weather forecasts had predicted rain and it became a race against time for England to win the match before rain arrived while India would have to hold out for a draw. VVS Laxman and Dhoni produced a stand of 86 runs before Laxman was bowled by Tremlett.

This left Dhoni with the task of rear guard which was to protect the tail from the English attack. The next 3 wickets fell within 8 overs leaving India on 263/9. With light deteriorating Vaughan and Panesar bowled the final 7 overs of the match. Sreesanth survived a strong lbw appeal from Panesar before bad light forced tea to be taken early. Rain meant that there was no evening session and the Test ended in a draw. Pietersen was awarded man of the match for his (134) century.

2nd Test

Day One

India won the toss and chose to bowl on a pitch which was wet due to rainfall over the past few days. From then on, England were on the back foot and kept on losing wickets. India had an exceptional day with the ball. Alastair Cook scored 43 and became the youngest England batsman to cross 1500 test runs, before being dismissed lbw by Ganguly. Zaheer was the pick of the Indian Bowlers and took 3 wickets. The other Indian Bowlers responded well, too. England ended the day at 169-7 at Stumps on Day 1.
Day Two

England resumed at 169-7, were done for 198 at the 1st session itself and so, the useful landmark of 200 proved elusive to England. Cook was the top scorer for England with 43 and Khan was the pick of the bowlers whose spell read: 21-5-57-4. The Indians began their innings well with Jaffer and Karthik scoring half centuries and putting 147 runs for the 1st wicket before Jaffer was caught behind for 62. Wickets of Karthik(77) and Dravid(37) also fell but India moved to a safe position of 254-3 at Stumps on Day 2. Tendulkar scored his 11000th test run.
Day Three

India resumed at 254-3. Tendulkar, Ganguly and Laxman scored half centuries and were dismissed for 91, 79 and 54 respectively. India were eventually done for 481 with the lower order except Sreeshanth and Singh making some contributions with the bat, and England had a tough 16 overs to reckon with in this day. But this time, England Batsman showed some composure and were 43-0 at stumps on Day 3 with the openers Cook and Strauss scoring 17 and 21 respectively.
Day Four

England resumed at 43-0 but the breakthrough for India came in the 3rd over itself when Khan trapped Cook plumb in front for 23. Strauss scored  fifty, but was dismissed by Khan due to a loose short and Singh struck with the wickets of Peterson and Prior. Vaughan carried on to score a century and his 5000th test run to keep England in the hunt. But India opted for the new ball and Khan inflicted thunder-blows by dismissing both Vaughan and Bell. Collingwood was also dismissed by Khan after he scored a fifty. England were eventually bundled up for 355 which left India with 73 runs to win the match. India ended the day with 10-0 at stumps on day 4 but the day was about Zaheer Khan, whose spell of the second innings read: 27-10-75-5.
Day Five

India began the day with only 63 runs left to make in order to win the match. Wasim Jaffer and Dinesh Karthik began to added 22 runs the Indian score. The Indian team soon lost the wickets of Jaffer, Karthik and Sachin. Ganguly and Dravid made 2 and 11 runs respectively confirming the Indian win. Zaheer Khan was adjudged man of the match for his 9 wickets in  the match.

3rd Test

India won the toss, and chose to bat first on a flat wicket which proved very good for batting. Both teams were unchanged again from the Trent Bridge Test, creating the rare scenario of both teams fielding the same 11 players per side for all matches of the series.

England’s bowlers worked hard throughout days 1 and 2, but were unable to replicate the successes they had previously achieved against India’s powerful batting line up. Dinesh Karthik continued his good form to score 91, and Rahul Dravid scored 55 before he was clean bowled by a good delivery from James Anderson. England’s cause was not helped by dropped catches from the wicketkeeper Matt Prior – first off Sachin Tendulkar when he was on 20, and then VVS Laxman when he was on 41. Tendulkar went on to make 82, and Laxman 51. Prior also conceded five lots of four byes on day 1, though some of these might conceivably have been signalled wide.

India finished day 1 on 316/4, and accelerated their scoring significantly on day 2. Mahendra Singh Dhoni scored 92, and was only dismissed off the part-time spin of Kevin Pietersen after having hit two massive sixes and attempting a third. Then, veteran spinner Anil Kumble registered his maiden test century in his 118th match, which was a delightful moment for all followers of Indian cricket. Kumble would go unbeaten, finishing on 110 not out, and the lower order all contributed useful runs to help India compile an enormous score of 664. This total pretty much ensured that India could not lose the match, and would therefore win the series.

England came out to bat late on day 2, and lost the wicket of Andrew Strauss before the close. They continued to lose wickets regularly through day 3, with the shot selection of some of the middle order batsmen being called into question. Zaheer Khan, India’s bowler of the series picked up three wickets and Kumble also took three. For England, Alastair Cook, Ian Bell and Paul Collingwood all scored in the 60s, but no one went on to make a big score – leaving England on 345 all out early on day 4 and facing the prospect of following on.

Rahul Dravid chose not to enforce the follow-on, however, a decision regarded as negative by many. However, there were concerns about Zaheer Khan who may have strained his thigh, and both India and Australia have been reluctant to enforce the follow-on since the incredible match in Kolkata in 2001 where India won the match having been forced to follow-on by Australia.

For a short period, Dravid’s decision looked to be potentially dangerous as England captured three very early wickets to leave India on 11/3, with an overall lead of 330. Dravid himself then batted in a very defensive manner, in an innings where he scored 12 from 96 deliveries. At one point, he had only scored 2 from 52 balls. However, Sourav Ganguly batted aggressively at the other end, and Laxman and Dhoni also contributed to boost India’s score, and allow Dravid to declare leaving England exactly 500 to win in 110 overs.

England survived until the end of day 4 without loss. For the most part, they batted sensibly throughout day 5 to reach 369/6 by the close of play and secure themselves a draw. However, there were still questions about the technique of some of the batsmen, with Michael Vaughan, Kevin Pietersen and Ian Bell all falling to slightly injudicious shots. Pietersen scored another test century, which was the main contributor to ensuring the draw by the close of play. Kumble was awarded man of the match.

India had won the series 1–0, and secured their first series victory in England since 1986. Overall, the series had been a very good one, with two evenly matched sides competing well. England were unlucky not to win the first test at Lords due to rain, although they had had their chances. India seized on the opportunities they created at Trent Bridge to take the lead, and then first and foremost batted England out of contention in the final test, before thinking about winning it, which they did very effectively.

NatWest Series (ODI)

1st ODI

Alastair Cook and Ian Bell both posted maiden ODI centuries, and James Anderson took three early wickets in India's chase to leave them on 34/4, and ensuring that the target of 289 was well out of their reach.

2nd ODI

3rd ODI

4th ODI

India's decision to bat first seemed to be a mistake after they were left 32/3 but Sachin Tendulkar's half century and small contributions later pushed India to 212.

This seemingly was enough for the touring side as England crashed to 0/1 and soon 35/3. By the time captain Paul Collingwood was run out, England needed 99 runs to win with all-rounder Ravi Bopara and bowler Stuart Broad to fend off the remaining 26 overs. Surprisingly the two put a record eight wicket partnership for England, the hosts taking the series 3–1 with a three-wicket victory and Broad picking up man of the match for his 45 not out and 4/51.

5th ODI

6th ODI
{{Limited overs matches
| date = 5 September 
| team1 = 
| score1 = 316/6 (50 overs)
| score2 = 317/8 (49.4 overs)
| team2 = 
| runs1 = Owais Shah 107* (95)
| wickets1 = Zaheer Khan 1/43 (10 Overs)
| runs2 = Sachin Tendulkar 94 (81) 
| wickets2 = Stuart Broad 2/46 (9.4 overs)
| result = India won by 2 wickets |
| report = Scorecard
| venue = The Oval, London
| umpires = Aleem Dar (Pak) and Peter Hartley (Eng)
| motm = Sachin Tendulkar (Ind)
| toss = England won the toss and elected to bat.
| rain = 
| notes = Luke Wright (Eng) made his ODI debut.
Owais Shah (Eng) scored his first century in ODIs.
}}

7th ODI

External sources

CricketArchive
cricinfo.com
Video highlights
Ball by Ball Simulation with Text, Audio Commentary

Notes and references
 
 
 Playfair Cricket Annual 
 Wisden Cricketers Almanack''

2007 in English cricket
2007
International cricket competitions in 2007
July 2007 sports events in the United Kingdom
August 2007 sports events in the United Kingdom
September 2007 sports events in the United Kingdom